Mikang is a Local Government Area in Plateau State, Nigeria. Its headquarters are in the town of Tunkus.

It has an area of 739 km and a population of 97,411 at the 2006 census.

The postal code of the area is 940.

Languages
West Chadic languages of Mikang LGA:

Koenoem language
Montol language
Pyapun language

References

Local Government Areas in Plateau State